All the Hits Live Tour is the third concert tour by Australian recording artist Jessica Mauboy. The tour visited venues in Adelaide, Canberra, Brisbane, Darwin, the Gold Coast, Melbourne, Newcastle and Sydney and included tracks from the album The Secret Daughter: Songs from the Original TV Series as well as hits from her 10-year catalogue.

The tour was recorded from Sydney's ICC Theatre in April and edited into a 90-minute special. It was premiered on Foxtel on 21 July 2017. It was released on DVD and Blu-ray in October 2017.

Critical reception 
auspOp said "What impressed us most about the All The Hits Live tour was Jessica’s ability to transcend genres – dance, pop, urban, soul, country – so effortlessly and flawlessly." adding "We came away seriously impressed from a show that showcased an Aussie talent’s vocal, moves, performance and back catalogue of pop gems."

Cameron Adams from news.com.au said "Her genre-hopping is relentless and refreshing, literally from country twanger to club banger in a space of a few minutes. Her band (complete with brass section) follow her deftly through the musical time travelling" adding "This tour ... demonstrates how hard work and deep talent can be a deadly combination."

Opening acts 
Isaiah

Set list 
This is the DVD/Blu-Ray release track listing.

 "Can I Get a Moment?"
 "Saturday Night"	
 "Better Be Home Soon"	
 "Flame Trees"	
 "Get 'Em Girls" / "Handle It"	
 "Running Back"	
 "Words"	
 "Land of 1000 Dances"	
 "I Can't Help Myself"	
 "Gotcha"
 "Risk It"	
 "Galaxy"
 "Burn"
 "Pop a Bottle (Fill Me Up)"

Tour dates

Charts

Weekly charts

Year-end charts

Release history

Personnel
 Parade Artist Management - Management
 Rachael Johnston - Design, Film Editor
 Ivan Ordenes - Sound Engineer

Band
 Dugald McAndrew - Drums, Keyboard

References

2017 concert tours
Jessica Mauboy concert tours